The Ghost Train is a 1927 German-British crime comedy film directed by Géza von Bolváry and starring Guy Newall, Ilse Bois and Louis Ralph. It is an adaptation of Arnold Ridley's play The Ghost Train. The film was a co-production between Gainsborough Pictures and Phoebus Film and was shot at the latter's Staaken Studios in Berlin. The film was released in France as Le Train Fantome.

Some sources have reported over the years that the film was directed by famed Hungarian director Michael Curtiz but, according to critic Troy Howarth, "he's not credited on the prints, nor is the title attributed to him in any reputable source".

The story was filmed again (with sound) in 1931.

Plot 
Some strange supernatural phenomenon starts to occur in a railway station, leading members of the public to avoid the place. It turns out some criminals are faking the strange events to keep people away from the station to protect their smuggling operations.

Cast

References

Bibliography

External links 

1927 films
1920s ghost films
Films of the Weimar Republic
British crime comedy films
British silent feature films
German crime comedy films
1920s crime comedy films
Films directed by Géza von Bolváry
1920s German-language films
1920s English-language films
British films based on plays
Films set in England
Rail transport films
Gainsborough Pictures films
Phoebus Film films
Films produced by Arnold Pressburger
Films shot at Staaken Studios
German silent feature films
British black-and-white films
German black-and-white films
1927 comedy films
Silent crime comedy films
1920s multilingual films
1920s British films
Silent horror films
1920s German films